Niemirowicz-Szczytt (plural in Polish Niemirowiczowie-Szczyttowie) was a noble Polish family. It used Jastrzębiec coat of arms. They also used another forms of surname like Niemirowicz-Szczyt, Szczytt-Niemirowicz, Szczyt-Niemirowicz, Szczytt or Szczyt. 

The family is directly descended from Jan Niemira of Wsielub, the boyar coming from the Grand Duchy of Lithuania who was adopted during the Union of Horodło by Wojciech Jastrzębiec, the then bishop of Cracow and granted Polish coat of arm Jastrzębiec.  

Szczytt family belonged to the higher class of Lithuanian nobility (panięta) in the first half of 16th century.

One of the first prominent member of this family was Jan Szczytowicz (d. 1519 or 1520), prince's marshall (hospodarski marszałek) during the reign of Zygmunt I Stary.

Notable members
Jan Szczytowicz (d. 1519 or 1520)
Justynian Szczytt (d. 1677)
Józef Szczytt (d. 1745), Mściław's castellan, member of parliament
Józef Szczytt (d. between 1808 and 1817), Brzesk's castellan, member of parliament
Justynian Szczytt (1740-1824), member of Permanent Council, member of parliament
Feliks Szczytt (1789-1865), a priest
Krzysztof Szczytt (d. 1720) - Smoleńsk's castellan, member of parliament
Krzysztof Szczytt (d. 1776) - general

Notes

References

Further reading
T. Jaszczołt, Ród Niemiry z Wsielubia - Niemirowiczowie i Szczytowie herbu Jastrzębiec do połowy XVI wieku. In: Unia w Horodle na tle stosunków polsko-litewskich, ed. S. Górzynski, Wydawnictwo DiG, Warszawa 2015, p. 230-245.

Polish noble families
Clan of Jastrzębiec